Louisiana's 23rd State Senate district is one of 39 districts in the Louisiana State Senate. It has been represented by Republican Page Cortez, the current Senate President, since 2012.

Geography
District 23 is based in Lafayette Parish, including much of southern Lafayette as well as the suburban towns of Broussard, Scott, and Youngsville.

The district is located entirely within Louisiana's 3rd congressional district, and overlaps with the 31st, 43rd, 44th, 45th, and 48th districts of the Louisiana House of Representatives.

Recent election results
Louisiana uses a jungle primary system. If no candidate receives 50% in the first round of voting, when all candidates appear on the same ballot regardless of party, the top-two finishers advance to a runoff election.

2019

2015

2011

Federal and statewide results in District 23

References

Louisiana State Senate districts
Lafayette Parish, Louisiana